Shopian district, known as Shupyan in Kashmiri, is a hill district with its administrative division in Shopian town, located in the Indian union territory of Jammu and Kashmir, since it is situated on the historical road commonly known as Mughal Road, most of its area is occupied by forests. Shopian district comes under the Pir Panjal Range which makes it very cold in winter. After partition of India, it was a tehsil of Pulwama district. In March, 2007, the district status was granted by the Government of India. The economy of the district depends on agriculture, particularly apple growing.

Shopian district is called "the apple bowl of Kashmir".

Demographics
According to the 2011 census, the Shopian district has a population of 266,215. This gives the Shopian district a ranking of 577th in India (out of a total of 640). Its population growth rate over the 2001–2011 decade was 25.85%. Shopian has a sex ratio of 951 females for every 1,000 males (this varies with religion), and a literacy rate of 62.49%.

At the time of the 2011 census, 87.99% of the population spoke Kashmiri, 8.80% Gojri and 1.78% Pahari as their first language.

Education
In 1988, The Government of Jammu and Kashmir established a college namely Government Degree College, Shopian which provides higher education infrastructure to the people of Shopian district. The Government Polytechnic college was established recently in the Shopian town, which provides technical engineering diploma level education.

Some of the other notable educational institutions are:
 Jawahar Navodaya Vidyalaya, Shopian
 Government higher secondary, Shopian
 And also various private higher secondary and high schools

Economy 
The local economy depends on agriculture.  Apple growing "provides employment to about 60% of the population and is the main source of livelihood of many households." Apple growing is more profitable than other crops, partly because the hilly nature of the land makes it harder to cultivate other crops than apples.

Healthcare 
The district has a number of hospitals and healthcare facilities, some of which include its adjoining areas they are:
 Government District Hospital Shopian
 Sub District Hospital Zainapora, 
 Sub District Hospital Keller
 NTPHC Wachi
 Primary Health centre Aglar
 NTPHC Ramnagri
 PHC Herman
 PHC Pinjura
 PHC DK Pora

Places of interest

The Jamia Masjid in Shopian is one of the famous historical monuments built during the Mughal reign resembling that of jamia Masjid Srinagar.
The Aasar-i-Sharief Dargah at Pinjura, attracts thousands of devotees on the occasion of Eid-i-Milad-un- Nabi and Shab-i-Mehraj.
Darul Uloom Islamia Pinjura where large people gather to seek (spiritual and moral) knowledge and propagate to others.Another famous muslim seminary called Jamia Sirajul Uloom is situated at Imamsahib.

On the outskirts of Shopian town near Nagbal area, there is a Siva temple called Kapalmochan Mandir with three natural springs and a unique Shivling with small Rudraksh shaped knots spread all over it.

Transport

The major roads connecting Shopian with neighbouring districts are:

Shopian-Pulwama-Srinagar Road
Shopian-Anantnag Via Chitragam
shopian to Aglar via heff turkuwangam
Shopian -Anantnag via Kaider
Shopian Anantnag Via Kulgam khudwani Wanpoh khanabal
shopian to sangam via Aglar
Shopian-Rajouri-Poonch via Mughal Road
Shopian-Zawoora-Keller
Shopian-Sedow-Aharbal
Shopian-Hirpora
Shopian-Bijbehara via Malik Gund Imamsahib, 
Shopian-Pinjoor
Shopian-Zainapora( Babapora)- Frisal- khudwani
Shopian-Zainapora( Babapora)- wachi - Sangam
Shopian to Kulgam Kachdoora, Sehpora Mohan Pora or Okay
Shopian to Reshnagri via Narwaw, Saidpora
Shopian to Nehama via Vehil Nowgam, Kanjiullar
Shopian to Ramnagri via Narwaw, Saidpora, Amshipora.
Shopian to Kangiullar via Ramnagri and Gadiporahir
Shopian to Kheer Bhawani at Mamzam via Ramnagri, Kanjiuller Nihama
Shopian to Aharbal via Ramnagri, Gadipora and Nihama
Shopian to Zawoora via Rambiara.
Shopian to Shadab Karewa Via Zowoora.
Shopian to Narapora, keller via Zawoora
Shopain to Aharbal via Saidow
Shopian Arshi pora road to link Via Herman Kadder Road
Shopian to Manzimpara via Kundalan.
Shopian to Anantnag via Manihall and Yaripora
Shopian to Toolihalan
Shopian to Aharbal via Ramnagri, Reshnagri, Bridge Completed in Last year.

.

References

External links
Official website

 
Districts of Jammu and Kashmir